Owe Nordqvist (23 September 1927 – 26 August 2015) was a Swedish cyclist. He competed in the 4,000 metres team pursuit at the 1952 Summer Olympics.

References

1927 births
2015 deaths
Swedish male cyclists
Olympic cyclists of Sweden
Cyclists at the 1952 Summer Olympics
Sportspeople from Stockholm